The Dangerous Maid is a 1923 American silent historical comedy-drama film produced and distributed by Joseph M. Schenck Productions and directed by Victor Heerman. Based upon the novel Barbara Winslow, Rebel by Elizabeth Ellis, it was distributed through Associated First National Pictures.

Plot
As described in a film magazine review, the Duke of Monmouth's 1685 rebellion in England fails. Monmouth adherent Barbara Winslow disguises herself to lead his pursuers astray. She falls into the hands of the Royal troops. Later, she obtains documents compromising Judge George Jeffreys, and forces him to sign pardons for all involved.

Cast

Preservation
A print of The Dangerous Maid is preserved in the Library of Congress collection (not in FIAF).

References

External links

1923 films
American silent feature films
First National Pictures films
Films set in the 1680s
American black-and-white films
1920s historical comedy-drama films
American historical comedy-drama films
Films set in England
1923 comedy films
1923 drama films
Films directed by Victor Heerman
1920s American films
1920s English-language films
Silent American comedy-drama films